Carreghofa Halt railway station is a disused station in Carreghofa, Powys, Wales. The station opened in 1938 and closed in 1965.

References

Further reading

Disused railway stations in Powys
Railway stations in Great Britain closed in 1938
Railway stations in Great Britain closed in 1965
Former Great Western Railway stations
Beeching closures in Wales
1938 establishments in Wales
1965 disestablishments in Wales
Railway stations in Great Britain opened in the 20th century